The Irish Horseracing Regulatory Board (IHRB) is the regulatory body for the sport of horse racing in Ireland. The body, which is a limited company, took over the regulatory work previously carried out by the Turf Club and the Irish National Hunt Steeplechase Committee on 1 January 2018.

See also 
Horse racing in Ireland

References

External links 
 Official website

2018 establishments in Ireland
Horse racing in Ireland
Horse racing organizations
Sports organizations established in 2018
Regulatory boards